Mont-de-Marsan Agglomération is the communauté d'agglomération, an intercommunal structure, centred on the town of Mont-de-Marsan. It is located in the Landes department, in the Nouvelle-Aquitaine region, southwestern France. Created in 1998, its seat is in Mont-de-Marsan. Its area is 481.1 km2. Its population was 53,875 in 2019 with a population density of 112/km sq, of which 29,807 in Mont-de-Marsan proper.

Composition
The communauté d'agglomération consists of the following 18 communes:

Benquet
Bostens
Bougue
Bretagne-de-Marsan
Campagne
Campet-et-Lamolère
Gaillères
Geloux
Laglorieuse
Lucbardez-et-Bargues
Mazerolles
Mont-de-Marsan
Pouydesseaux
Saint-Avit
Saint-Martin-d'Oney
Saint-Perdon
Saint-Pierre-du-Mont
Uchacq-et-Parentis

References

Mont-de-Marsan
Mont-de-Marsan